The Mississippi College Choctaws football team represents Mississippi College. The school's teams are known as the Choctaws. Its major rivals are Millsaps College in nearby Jackson and Delta State in Cleveland, Mississippi in the Delta.  After a more than 40-year hiatus, MC and Millsaps teams began meeting on the football field again in 2000.  The rivalry is dubbed the Backyard Brawl.

History

The first year of the team was in 1907. The 1921 team was led by Hall of Famer Edwin "Goat" Hale.

The team won the Division II National Championship in 1989, however, Mississippi College's football tournament participation, along with its NCAA Division II national football championship, were vacated by the NCAA Committee on Infractions for recruiting violations.

Facilities 
Robinson-Hale Stadium, a 8,500-capacity stadium located in Clinton, Mississippi, is home to the Mississippi College Choctaws football team.

The stadium was built in 1985 and named after two significant contributors to the program, Stanley L. Robinson, who coached the team from 1920 to 1923 and again from 1928 to 1953, and Edwin Hale, who played for the Choctaws between 1915 and 1921 and was later inducted into the College Football Hall of Fame. The first game at the stadium was played October 12, 1985. The Choctaws defeated Jacksonville State, 50–3.

Prior to the 2005 season, the stadium saw major renovations that included the installation of a state-of-the art synthetic playing surface. A running track, the James E. Parkman Track, was added in 2006. In 2011, the entrance got renovated with a new "Circle of Champions" entrance. The turf at the stadium was upgraded in 2015.

Playoffs

NCAA Division II
The Choctaws have four appearances in the NCAA Division II football playoffs, with a combined record of 4-4. This total does not include a vacated national championship in 1989, which included one additional appearance and a 4-0 record.

NCAA Division III
The Choctaws made one appearances in the NCAA Division III football playoffs, with a combined record of 1-1.

Program achievements

References

External links
 
 

 
American football teams established in 1907
1907 establishments in Mississippi